Adam Brooks (born May 6, 1996) is a Canadian professional ice hockey centre currently playing for the Lehigh Valley Phantoms in the American Hockey League (AHL) while under contract to the Philadelphia Flyers of the National Hockey League (NHL). He was selected in the fourth-round, 92nd overall, by the Toronto Maple Leafs in the 2016 NHL Entry Draft.

Playing career

Amateur
While playing AAA hockey for the Winnipeg Hawks, both Brooks and his older brother Brett attended West Kildonan Collegiate. Brooks ended the season being named AAA Impact Player of the Year and MVP.

Brooks was selected 25th overall by the Regina Pats in the 2011 Western Hockey League (WHL) draft after recording 111 points with the Winnipeg Hawks. He signed with the Pats on August 24, 2011, but was reassigned to the Winnipeg Thrashers in the Manitoba U-18 'AAA' Hockey League. While with the Thrashers, Brooks was selected to play for Team Canada at the 2012 Winter Youth Olympics in Innsbruck Austria. At the conclusion of the 2011–12 season, Brooks recorded 41 points in 37 games, and appeared in the Western Canada Under-16 Challenge.

After only recording 11 points during the 2013–14 season, Brooks was passed over in his first year of eligibility for the NHL Entry Draft. Prior to the beginning of the new season, the Pats hired Dave Struch and Brooks excelled that season, recording 62 points in 64 games. Despite going undrafted again, Brooks partook in the New York Rangers rookie camp.

His success continued into the following season where Brooks lead the league with 82 assists and 120 points,  which earned him the Bob Clarke Trophy. This also earned him a 72nd final ranking from the NHL Central Scouting Bureau amongst North American skaters. By the time the 2016 NHL Entry Draft came around, Brooks was drafted 92nd overall by the Toronto Maple Leafs. Brooks was named team captain of the Pats to start his final junior year in the 2016–17 WHL season. Although the Pats qualified for the playoffs, Brooks injured his knee in Game 2 of an Eastern Conference semi-final and was out for the rest of the series. At the conclusion of his junior career, Brooks ranked third all-time in regular-season games played with 317, 10th in career points with 335, and sixth in assists with 216. He was also named to the WHL First All-Star team.

Professional
On June 29, 2017, Brooks was signed to a three-year, entry-level contract with the Toronto Maple Leafs. After attending the Leafs training camp, Brooks was reassigned to their American Hockey League (AHL) affiliate, the Toronto Marlies, to begin the 2017–18 season. Brooks played on a line with Ben Smith and Colin Greening, whom helped him record his first career AHL point in a 4–0 win over the Charlotte Checkers. He later scored his first career AHL goal in a 5–1 win over the Belleville Senators on December 31, 2017. Brooks finished his rookie campaign with the Marlies recording 19 points in 57 regular AHL games, and six points in 20 playoff games to help lead the Marlies to their first Calder Cup in franchise history.

After attending the Leafs training camp, Brooks was reassigned to the Marlies for the 2018–19 AHL season. The Marlies qualified for the 2019 Calder Cup playoffs, where Brooks recorded a hat trick to sweep the Marlies past the Rochester Americans. Brooks played his first NHL game against the New York Rangers on December 28, 2019. Brooks finished the season with 3 points in 7 games with the Maple Leafs and 9 goals and 20 points in 29 games for the Marlies. He re-signed with the Maple Leafs to a two-year, two-way contract in May 2020. On January 22, 2021, Brooks scored his first NHL goal with the Maple Leafs on Mikko Koskinen of the Edmonton Oilers. He finished the season with 5 points in 11 games with the Maple Leafs.

On October 10, 2021, prior to the  season, Brooks was placed on waivers by the Maple Leafs as part of pre-season roster cuts. He was subsequently claimed by the Montreal Canadiens the following day. He appeared in four games with the Canadiens. Brooks was placed back on waivers by Montreal on November 16, 2021; the following day, he was claimed by the Vegas Golden Knights. Brooks played in seven games for the Golden Knights, scoring two goals. On February 15, 2022, Brooks was placed on waivers by the Golden Knights, and subsequently re-claimed by Toronto the next day. However, on February 17, Toronto placed Brooks on waivers again; the following day, he was claimed by the Winnipeg Jets. He finished the season with 14 games played for the Jets.

On July 13, 2022, Brooks was signed as a free agent to a two-year, two-way contract with the Philadelphia Flyers.

Career statistics

Regular season and playoffs

International

Awards and honours

References

External links
 

1996 births
Living people
Canadian ice hockey centres
Henderson Silver Knights players
Lehigh Valley Phantoms players
Montreal Canadiens players
Regina Pats players
Ice hockey people from Winnipeg
Toronto Maple Leafs draft picks
Toronto Maple Leafs players
Toronto Marlies players
Vegas Golden Knights players
Winnipeg Jets players
Ice hockey players at the 2012 Winter Youth Olympics